Pagan Christianity may refer to:

Gentile (non-Jewish) Christianity; see Pauline Christianity
Syncretism of folk religion and Christianity; see Folk Christianity, Folk Catholicism and Folk Orthodoxy
Early Christianity influenced by pagan (Greco-Roman, Hellenistic) philosophy and culture; see origins of Christianity 
Pagan Christianity, a non-fiction book by George Barna and Frank Viola

See also
Christianity and neopaganism
Christianity and paganism
Christian mythology
Christian syncretism
Christian views on magic
Circumcision controversy in early Christianity
Esoteric Christianity
Gentile
Neoplatonism and Christianity